The Waycross Moguls were a minor league baseball team, based in Waycross, Georgia as a representative of the Florida–Alabama–Georgia League in 1915. However the team originated in 1906 as the Waycross Machinists of the Georgia State League for one season. Waycross' minor league baseball team was then revived in 1913 as the Waycross Blowhards of the Empire State League. In 1914 they were known as the Waycross Grasshoppers before changing their name to the Moguls during the season.

References
Baseball Reference -Waycross, Georgia

Defunct minor league baseball teams
Professional baseball teams in Georgia (U.S. state)
Waycross, Georgia micropolitan area
Baseball teams established in 1906
1906 establishments in Georgia (U.S. state)
1915 disestablishments in Georgia (U.S. state)
Baseball teams disestablished in 1915
Defunct baseball teams in Georgia
Defunct Georgia State League teams